The Sterling micropolitan area may refer to:

The Sterling, Illinois micropolitan area, United States
The Sterling, Colorado micropolitan area, United States

See also
Sterling (disambiguation)